University Peak is a peak at the head of University Valley,  south-southwest of West Beacon, in Victoria Land, Antarctica. It was named by United States Antarctic Program (USARP) researchers Heinz Janetschek, biologist at McMurdo Station, 1961–62, and Fiorenzo Ugolini, geologist at McMurdo Station, 1961–62, after their respective university affiliation, Leopold-Franzens-Universitat at Innsbruck, Austria, and Rutgers University at New Brunswick, New Jersey.

References

Mountains of Victoria Land
Scott Coast